This is an alphabetical list of named rocks (and meteorites) found on Mars, by mission. This list is a sampling of rocks viewed, and is not an exhaustive listing. A more complete listing may be found on the various NASA mission web sites. This listing does not include Martian meteorites found on Earth.

Because of this, some less significant rocks seen in photos returned by Mars rovers have been named more than once, and others have even had their names changed later due to conflicts or even matters of opinion. Often rocks are named after the children or family members of astronauts or NASA employees. The name Jazzy, for example, was taken from a girl named Jazzy who grew up in Grand Junction, CO, USA. Her father worked for NASA and contributed to the findings and naming of the rocks.

1976 – Viking program: Viking 1 and Viking 2 landers 
 

Viking 1 Lander – July 20, 1976; Last Earth Contact – November 13, 1982.
Viking 1 was operational on Mars for  sols ( days).
Mars landing coordinates: 

Viking 2 Lander – September 3, 1976; Last Earth Contact – April 11, 1980.
Viking 2 was operational on Mars for  sols ( days).
Mars landing coordinates: 
(Raw Images - Camera/Sol and 1-JPL and 2-JPL + NASA Image Viewer.)

1997 – Sojourner rover (Mars Pathfinder) 

 rover – July 4, 1997; Last Earth Contact – September 27, 1997.
Sojourner was operational on Mars for  sols ( days).
Mars landing coordinates: 
(Raw Images - 1-Camera/Sol and 2-Camera/Sol and 3-Camera/Sol and 1-JPL and 2-JPL + NASA Image Viewer.)

 Anthill
 Auto
 Baby Otter
 Bama
 Bambam
 Barnacle Bill
 Barsoom
 Basket
 Bebob
 Blackhawk
 Book Shelf
 Booboo
 Bosco
 Boyle
 Brak
 Brick
 Broken Wall
 Bug
 Bullwinkle
 Bunky
 Cabbage Patch
 Calvin
 Cardiac Hill
 Casper
 Chimp
 Clumk
 Contour
 Couch
 Cradle
 Darth Vader
 Desert Princess
 Dilbert
 Dilbert's Boss
 Dogbert
 Dragon
 Duck
 Elvis
 Ender
 Flat Top
 Flipper
 Flute Top
 Frog
 Froggy
 Garfield
 Garibaldi
 Garrak
 Geordi
 Ginger
 Goldilocks
 Goose
 Gosling
 Grandma
 Grizzly
 Grommit
 Gumby
 Half Dome
 Hamster
 Hardstop
 Hassock
 Hedgehog
 Hero
 Hippo
 Hobbs
 Homer
 Hoppy
 Iggie
 Iguana
 Indiana Jones
 Jailhouse
 Janeway
 Jazzy
 Jedi
 Jimmy Cricket
 Kitten
 Lamb
 Landon
 Little Flat Top
 Longhorn
 Lookout
 Lozenge
 Lumpy
 Lunchbox
 Mafalda
 Marvin the Martian
 Matterhorn
 Mesa
 Mini
 Mint Julep
 Moe
 Mohawk
 Mouse
 Mr. Mole
 Nibbles
 Nigel
 Obelisk
 Otter
 Pancake
 Paz
 Penguin
 Picnic
 Piglet
 Pinky
 Pinocchio
 Piper
 Platypus
 Pokey
 Poohbear
 Poptart
 Potato
 Pumpkin
 Pyramid
 Pyramid Point
 Ratbert
 Ren
 Rocky
 Rolling Stone
 Rye Bread
 Sandworm
 Sardine
 Sassafras
 Scooby Doo
 Scout
 Seawolf
 Shaggy
 Shark
 Simba
 Sisyphus
 Smidgen
 Snoopy
 Snowy
 Snukums
 Souffle
 Squash
 Squeeze
 Space Ghost
 Spock
 Spud
 Stack
 Stimpy
 Stripe
 Stump
 Sulu
 T. Rex
 The Dice
 Tick
 Tigger
 Titus
 Torres
 Troll
 Trooper
 Turtle
 Tweak
 Valentine
 Warthog
 Wedge
 Woodie
 Yogi
 Zaphod
 Zorak
 Zucchini

2004 – Spirit rover (MER-A) 

 Rover – January 4, 2004; Last Earth Contact – May 25, 2011.
Spirit was operational on Mars for  sols ( days).
Mars landing coordinates: 
(Raw Images - Camera/Sol and JPL + NASA Image Viewer.)

 Aboa
 Adirondack
 Allan Hills (iron meteorite)
 Arctowski
 Belgrand
 Bread-Basket
 Casey Station
 Castilla
 ChanCheng
 Cheyenne
 Clovis
 Coba
 Cobra Hoods
 Concordia
 Davis
 Druzhnaya
 Ebenezer
 El Dorado
 Esperanza
 Faget (geological feature)
 Ferraz
 Garruchaga
 Gueslega
 Halley
 Home Plate (geological feature)
 Humphrey
 Juan Carlos
 Jubany
 King George Island
 Kohnen
 Korolev
 Macquarie
 Magic Carpet
 Marambio
 Mazatzal
 Melchior
 Mimi
 Molodezhnaya
 Montalva
 Oberth (geological feature)
 O Higgens
 Orcadas
 Pot of Gold
 Prat
 Primero
 Riquelme
 San Martin
 Sashimi
 Scott Base
 Sejong
 Signy
 Sobral
 Stone Council
 Sushi
 Tetl
 Tor
 Tyrone
 Vernadsky
 Vostok
 Wasa
 White Boat
 Wishstone
 Zhong Shan (iron meteorite)

2004 – Opportunity rover (MER-B) 

 rover – January 25, 2004; Last Earth Contact June 10, 2018.
Opportunity was operational on Mars for  sols ( days).
Mars landing coordinates: 
(Raw Images - Camera/Sol and JPL + NASA Image Viewer.)

 Amboy 
 Berry Bowl 
 Baltra 
 Block Island (iron meteorite) 
 "Blueberries" 
 Bounce 
 Bylot 
 Carousel 
 Chapeco
 Cheyenne 
 Chocolate Hills 
 Cookies N Cream 
 Diamond Jenness 
 Earhart 
 El Capitan 
 Edmund
 Ellesmere 
 Escher 
 Esperance
 Flatrock 
 Florianopolis
 Guadalupe 
 Heat Shield  (iron meteorite) 
 Homestake (vein) 
 Igreja
 Ice Cream 
 Joacaba
 Jornada del Muerto 
 Joseph McCoy 
 Kalavrita 
 Kettlestone 
 Kirkwood 
 Lamination 
 Last Chance 
 Lion Stone 
 Mackinac Island  (iron meteorite) 
 Marquette Island
 McKittrick 
 Meridiani Planum  (iron meteorite) 
 Oileán Ruaidh  (iron meteorite) 
 Palemop
 Pilbara 
 Pinnacle Island
 Puffin 
 Pyrrho 
 Razorback 
 Santa Catarina 
 Sarah 
 Sergeant Charles Floyd 
 Shark Pellets 
 Shark's Tooth 
 Shelter Island  (iron meteorite) 
 Shoemaker 
 Slick 
 Snout 
 "Sparkling Spheres" 
 SpongeBob SquarePants 
 Steffers
 Stone Mountain 
 Tennessee 
 The Outcrop 
 Tipuna 
 Tubarao
 Videira
 Wave Ripple 
 Whitewater River 
 Wopmay 
 Xanxer
 Yuri

2008 – Phoenix lander 

 lander – May 25, 2008; Green Valley, Vastitas Borealis − Last Earth Contact – November 10, 2008.
Phoenix was operational on Mars for  sols ( days).
Mars landing coordinates: 
(Raw Images - Camera/Sol and JPL + NASA Image Viewer.)

 Baby Bear
 Burn Alive
 Burn Alive 3
 Dodo
 Goldilocks
 Lower Cupboard
 Mama Bear
 Neverland
 Papa Bear
 Rosy Red 2
 Rosy Red 3
 Runaway
 Snow White
 Stone Soup
 Upper Cupboard

2012 – Curiosity rover (Mars Science Laboratory) 

 rover – August 6, 2012; Gale crater; CURRENTLY ACTIVE.
Mars landing coordinates: 
(Raw Images - Camera and Sol and 1-JPL and 2-JPL + NASA Image Viewer.)

 Alexander Hills (area) 
 Amargosa Valley (area) 
 Bathurst Inlet 
 Bonanza King 
 Book Cliffs (area) 
 Buckskin 
 Burwash 
 Chinle (area)  
 Confidence Hills (area) 
 Coronation 
 Crest 
 Crestaurum 
 Cumberland 
 Darwin Outcrop 
 Dingo Gap (area) 
 Discovery Ridge (area) 
 Egg Rock (meteorite) 
 Ekwir_1  
 Et-Then 
 Flower-like rock 
 Garden City (area) 
 Gator-Back Rocks 
 Gillespie (area) 
 Gillespie Lake 
 Glenelg (area) 
 Goulburn 
 Harrison 
 Hidden Valley (area) 
 High Dune (area) 
 Hottah 
 Ithaca 
 Jake Matijevic 
 John Klein-A/B/C 
 Kimberley (area) 
 Knorr  
 Lamoose 
 Lebanon (iron meteorite) 
 Link 
 Little Colonsay 
 Marker Band (area) 
 Missoula 
 Mojave (area) 
 Mojave 2 
 Murray Unit (area) 
 Namib Dune (area) 
 Not Bones 
 Nova 
 Old Soaker 
 Pahrump Hills (area) 
 Panorama Point (area) 
 Pink Cliffs (area) 
 Point Lake (area) 
 Portage 
 Rapitan 
 Rocknest (area)
 Rocknest 3  
 Sayunei 
 Selwyn  
 Shaler 
 Sheepbed 
 Shoemaker  
 Snake River 
 Stimson unit (area) 
 Strathdon 
 Sutton Inlier (area)  
 Telegraph Peak (area) 
 Tintina 
 Twin Cairns Island (area) 
 Unnamed-20120902 
 Unnamed-20180102 
 Vera Rubin Ridge (area) 
 Waypoint 1 (area) 
 Wernecke 
 Whale 
 Whimsical 
 Wildrose 
 Windjana 
 Winnipesaukee 
 Yellowjacket 
 Yellowknife Bay (area)

2018 – InSight lander 
 – May 8, 2018; Elysium Planitia; CURRENTLY ACTIVE.
Mars landing coordinates: 
(Raw Images - NASA and JPL + NASA Image Viewer.)

2021 – Perseverance rover (Mars 2020) 

 rover – February 18, 2021; Jezero crater; CURRENTLY ACTIVE.
Mars landing coordinates: 
(Raw Images - Camera and Sol and 1-JPL + 2-JPL + 3-JPL + NASA Image Viewer.)

 Landing Site (area)
 AEGIS_0442B rock
 Artuby outcrop (area)
 Brac rock
 Cine rock
 "Crater Floor Fractured Rough" (area)
 Delta sediment (area)
 Dourbes rock
 Faillefeu rock
 First borehole (Roubion)
 Foux rock
 Garde rock
 Intriguing rocks
 Máaz – 1st study target
 Máaz rock
 Odd Rock
 "Paver rocks"
 Rochette rock
 SnakeHead rock
 Wind-carved rock
 Yeehgo rock

Other rock formations

 Cave entrances
 Face on Mars
 Mars monolith
 Mars rootless cones

See also

 
 
 
 
 List of craters on Mars
 List of minerals
 List of mountains on Mars
 List of quadrangles on Mars
 List of rock formations
 List of rock types
 List of valles on Mars
 
 Mineralogy of Mars

References

External links

 Mars - Geologic Map (USGS, 2014) (original / crop / full / video (00:56)).
 Google Images: Rocks on Mars and Martian Rocks
 Rocks on Mars (Geology.com)
 MPF Rock Names
 Named Rocks on Mars (ppt file)
 NASA – Mars Exploration Program
 Understanding 35 weird objects on Mars
 The Origins of Life (Robert Hazen, NASA) (video, 38m, April 2014).
  (Robert Hazen, NASA) (video, 70m, July 2019).